Margaretha (Greta) Zetterberg (1733 – 1803) was a Finnish textile and handcrafts worker. She is regarded as a pioneer within the linen industry in Finland. She was the first female in Finland to be given a financed study trip abroad by the authorities: she was sent to Stockholm to study the textile industry, and brought with her the latest technique, especially within the linen industry, to Borgå in Finland, where she was active.

See also
Elisabeth Forsell

References

 Suomen kansallisbiografia (Finlands nationalbiografi)
 Translate.google.se
 Vainio-Korhonen, Kirsi: Suomen herttuattaren arvoitus. Suomalaisia naiskohtaloita 1700-luvulta. Edita Publishing Oy, Helsinki, 2009, 

Finnish weavers
1733 births
1803 deaths
Linen industry
18th-century Finnish educators
18th-century Finnish women artists
18th-century women textile artists
18th-century textile artists